Andrėjus Tereškinas  (born 10 July 1970) is a former Lithuanian international footballer. He played on the left of defence.

He had a brief loan spell with Macclesfield Town during the 2000–01 season, where he appeared in just one match as a substitute.

Tereškinas made 56 appearances for the Lithuania national football team between 1991 and 2000.

He played one game for PFC CSKA Moscow in the 1996–97 UEFA Cup.

Honours
 Baltic Cup
 1991
 1992
 1994

References

 

1972 births
Living people
Lithuanian footballers
Lithuanian expatriate footballers
Lithuania international footballers
FK Žalgiris players
OKS Stomil Olsztyn players
Skonto FC players
Macclesfield Town F.C. players
PFC CSKA Moscow players
Lithuanian expatriate sportspeople in Kazakhstan
Expatriate footballers in Kazakhstan
Expatriate footballers in Poland
Lithuanian expatriate sportspeople in Poland
Expatriate footballers in Russia
Association football defenders